Cryphoecina is a monotypic genus of Balkan araneomorph spiders in the family Cybaeidae containing the single species, Cryphoecina deelemanae. It was first described by C. Deltshev in 1997, and has only been found in Montenegro. The type genus was transferred to the Cybaeidae in 2017.

References

Cybaeidae
Hahniidae
Monotypic Araneomorphae genera